A by-election was held for the seat of Currumbin in the Legislative Assembly of Queensland on 28 March 2020, the same day as the Bundamba by-election and local government elections, following the resignation of Jann Stuckey on 1 February 2020. Laura Gerber won the by-election, holding the seat for the Liberal National Party.

Key dates

Candidates

Opinion polling

Results

Notes

References

External links
Currumbin By-election – Electoral Commission Queensland
Currumbin by-election – ABC Elections
Currumbin by-election, 2020 – The Tally Room

Queensland state by-elections
Currumbin state by-election